Huang Jingyu (born November 30, 1992), also known as Johnny Huang, is a Chinese actor and model. He is known for his roles in Addicted (2016), Operation Red Sea (2018), Moonshine and Valentine (2018), and The Thunder (2019).

Early life
Huang entered college in the Eastern Liaoning University to study as flight attendant. He had worked several part-time jobs, before he was introduced by his friends to work as a model.

Huang has practiced Brazilian Jiu Jitsu and participated in many competitions. He has also won championships held in Shanghai Brazilian Jiu Jitsu College.

Career
In 2016, Huang made his acting debut in the 2016 romantic coming-of-age web drama Addicted, which follows love stories of four high school boys. The web drama was a success and garnered 10 million views the day after its initial release, and propelled Huang to fame. However, it was banned by SAPPRFT due to its homosexuality content. He then featured in the fantasy web drama Demon Girl 2.
The same year, he was cast in China's first zombie-themed black humor film Guns and Kidneys, which marks his big-screen debut. 

In 2018, Huang starred in the patriotic action film Operation Red Sea directed by Dante Lam which premiered in February. The film has grossed US$579 million, making it the highest-grossing Chinese film in 2018.  Huang  won the Best Newcomer Award at the Asian Film Awards for his performance in Operation Sea. The same year, Huang starred in the fantasy romance drama Moonshine and Valentine alongside Victoria Song.
The series received positive reviews for its high quality production, tight plot and fresh characterizations; and Huang was also praised for his performance and use of original voice. He also featured in a spin-off of the romance drama My Story for You. Forbes China listed Huang under their 30 Under 30 Asia 2017 list  which consisted of 30 influential people under 30 years old who have had a substantial effect in their fields.

In 2019, Huang starred in the comedy film Pegasus directed by Han Han, which premiered in February. The same year, he starred in the police drama The Thunder, which aired in May. He ranked 28th on Forbes China Celebrity 100 list.

In 2020, Huang starred in the workplace romance drama Love Advanced Customization, portraying a boss of an e-commerce company. He is set to star in youth drama film Wild Grass, and romance comedy film Oversize Love. He ranked 36th on Forbes China Celebrity 100 list.

Other activities

Endorsements and fashion
In 2016, Huang became the first celebrity to be featured on the China Merchants Bank's bank card. In June, he was invited to the Dolce & Gabbana Spring/Summer 2017 fashion show during Milan Fashion Week as one of the "Millennials"; front-row guests chosen for their online presence on Instagram and Weibo.

In 2017, he was chosen as the first male ambassador and spokesperson of international brand Pantene.

In 2018, he was appointed as the China's spokesperson and ambassador of the two perfume brands, Dior Fragrance and Elizabeth Arden. In August, he became the new ambassador of Sebastian Professional and Johnnie Walker. Later, he was honored as the first Chinese Brand Ambassador of Abercrombie & Fitch. In October, he was appointed as the global spokesperson of the two skincare brands SNP (Shining Nature Purity) and Sesderma.

In 2021, to mark its 170th year of founding, the swiss company Bally appointed Chinese actor Johnny Huang as its new global brand ambassador. Bally revealed Huang as the face of the fall 2021 ad campaign and confirmed he will also appear in the spring 2022 promotional image. Huang’s appointment marks the first time a Chinese figure has served as a global ambassador for the brand.

Ambassadorship 
In 2017, Huang attended the "15th Strait Youth Forum" and was awarded the title of "The Messenger of Youth Cultural Exchange between Fujian and Taiwan".
The same year, he was invited to the forum "Deciphering New Opportunities in Chinese Film" sponsored by Shanghai International Film Festival and NetEase Entertainment, and accepted the letter of appointment to become NetEase "Star Editor".

In January 2019, Huang was appointed as youth ambassador of 13th Asian Film Awards.

Filmography

Film

Television series

Variety show

Discography

Singles

Accolades

References

External links 
 
 
 

1992 births
Living people
21st-century Chinese male actors
Chinese male film actors
Chinese male television actors
Chinese male models
Male actors from Liaoning
Best Newcomer Asian Film Award winners